KMET or Kmet may refer to:

 KMET (AM),  a radio station (1490 AM) licensed to Banning, California, United States
 KMET (FM), a defunct FM radio station located in Los Angeles, California, United States
 Konferenz des Mitteleuropaeischen Turfs, a horse racing conference in Central Europe
Kmet (surname)